Domenico Toscano (born 4 August 1971) is an Italian football coach and former midfielder, currently working as head coach of  club Cesena.

Playing career
Raised in Reggina, in 1989, at the age of 18, he was sent on loan to Adelaide Nicastro, a Calabrian team from Serie C2 with whom he played 20 league games. At the end of the season he returned to Serie B, but in November 1990 he went on loan to Treviso in Serie C2, where he scored his first 3 goals as a professional in 19 appearances.

In the following season, he made his first 3 appearances for Reggina, in Serie C1, but in November 1991, he moved down the category again on loan to Catanzaro, where he played continuously. In the following year he returned to Serie C1 and played 20 matches at Potenza. In 1993 he returned to Reggio Calabria, in Serie C1, where he remained for four consecutive seasons in which he obtained promotion to Serie B in 1994-1995 and salvation in the cadets in 1995–1996. His debut in Serie B took place on 27 August 1995 in Reggina's 2–2 draw against Ancona.

In 1997 he was signed by Cosenza, with whom he straight away earned promotion to Serie B: under the guidance of Giuliano Sonzogni he played 25 games and scored 4 goals, one of which was decisive for winning the championship, scoring on the last day in an away match against Casarano. Toscano stayed with Coszena the following season, which ended with safety; making fourteen appearances, scoring against his former club, Reggina- which resulted in a 2–1 defeat at the Granillo.

In October 1999 he moved to Lucchese, in C1, going onto make 24 appearances under the guidance of Corrado Orrico. Two years at Lodigiani followed, with whom he played two C1 championships: 29 games and 4 goals in the first, 18 games and 1 goal in the second. The following year he was at Nocerina, in C2, then he moved to Rende where he won the 2003-2004 Serie D group, scoring 23 appearances and 2 goals. The following year, with the inhabitants of Rende, he played 13 matches in C2 before retiring in 2005.

During his playing career, Toscano collected 52 appearances in B, 3 goals, 2 promotions in B, a promotion in C2.

Coaching career
A year after retiring, Toscano  became a coach and promptly returned to Rende, heading the Berrettii (youth squad). In 2007 he was appointed as head coach at Serie D side Cosenza; with whom he lead to a double promotion from amateurs to First Division. During the 2009–2010 season he was sacked with five games remaining in the championship. He lead Cosenza to the final of the Coppa Italia Lega Pro, losing against Lumezzane (4-1 in Lumezzane, 1–1 in Cosenza); he was re-appointed to lead the Silani in June 2010 in view of the following Prima Divisione season, however- he was sacked before the start of the championship.

On 29 June 2011 he became coach of Ternana, which in 2011-2012 he led to promotion to Serie B two days before the end of the championship; the result earned him the First Division gold bench award. On 25 August 2012 he made his debut as a coach in Serie B, in the match lost on the Pro Vercelli field (1-0). The following 10 December he began attending the master qualification course for professional coaches First Category - UEFA Pro in Coverciano. After leading the team to ninth place in Serie B in 2012–2013, during Ternana-Empoli, the thirteenth day of the 2013-2014 championship, he reached 100 official benches with the red-green club. On 31 December 2013, after a string of negative results accrued in the first round, he was sacked and finished  with a record of 39 wins, 40 draws and 29 defeats in official matches.

On 3 July 2014 he signed as the new head coach of Novara in Serie C. On 10 May 2015, he obtained promotion with Novara to Serie B, with a win against Lumezzane. Two weeks later, Toscano lead Novara to the 2013–14 Supercoppa di Serie C. At the end of the season, he left Novara.

On 17 July 2015, Toscano returned to Ternana- with the side still in Serie B. However, the second experience in Terni proved to be short and negative; thus ending with his resignation on 23 September 2015.

On 4 June 2016, he returned to Serie B to become coach of Avellino. The following 26 November, due to disappointing results, he was sacked by the club; the experience in Campania ended with a balance of 4 victories, 4 draws and 9 defeats in 17 official matches.

On 27 February 2018, after more than a year without a club, Toscano was named head coach of Serie C side Feralpisalò. On 7 May 2019, after the end of the regular season, he was relieved of his duties, together with his staff, before the start of the playoffs.

On 21 June 2019, Toscano was appointed coach of his former side, Reggina on a two-year contract. Following the definitive suspension of the regular season due to the COVID-19 pandemic, Toscano won the championship bringing Reggina back to the second division after six-year absence, with 69 points collected in 30 games played, 9 points ahead of Bari in second place. He is the first person to obtain promotion to Serie B both as a player and manager in the history of Reggina. On 14 December 2020, after a complicated first part of the season, with the team in fifteenth place in Serie B, he was relieved of his duties a few hours after the home defeat against Venezia.

Exactly a year later, on 14 December 2021, Toscano returned to the bench of Reggina, replacing the sacked Alfredo Aglietti however, on 23 January 2022, a month after returning Toscano was  relieved of his duties with the team in fourteenth place and was replaced by Roberto Stellone.

On 18 June 2022, Toscano returned to Serie C as he was named coach of Cesena, on a two-year deal.

Managerial statistics

References

External links

1971 births
Living people
Italian footballers
Association football midfielders
Serie B players
Serie C players
A.S.G. Nocerina players
Reggina 1914 players
Italian football managers
Reggina 1914 managers
Ternana Calcio managers
Cosenza Calcio managers
Serie B managers
Serie C managers